Stuart Thomas Myall (born 12 November 1974) is an English former professional footballer who played as a defender. He began his career in the Football League at Brighton & Hove Albion and after an unsuccessful spell at Brentford, he dropped into non-League football.

Playing career

Early life 
Myall grew up in Eastbourne, East Sussex and was head boy at Cavendish School in the town.

Brighton & Hove Albion 
Born in Eastbourne, Myall joined the Brighton & Hove Albion's Centre Of Excellence at age 11. He made his debut for the club during the 1992–93 season and made seven Second Division appearances. He signed his first professional contract in April 1993. He gradually broke through into the first team and made 13 league appearances during the 1993–94 season and 27 in 1994–95, scoring his first two Brighton goals during the latter campaign. In the 1995–96 season, Myall made 33 league appearances and scored two goals. He was released by manager Jimmy Case at the end of the season, after the club's relegation to the Third Division was confirmed. During his time at the Goldstone Ground, Myall made 93 appearances and scored four goals. In 2002, Myall recalled that he "had a great time at Brighton. It was what I always wanted to do and I was at the Albion from a very young age. I had a really fantastic time and I was disappointed when I was released in 1996 because I had played quite a few games for the club. But we got relegated and Jimmy Case wanted to bring in his own players".

Brentford 
Myall signed a two-year contract with Second Division club Brentford on a free transfer during the summer of 1996. He failed to win a call into the first team squad during the 1996–97 season under manager David Webb and instead played for the club's reserve team, scoring six goals in 20 appearances. Under new manager Eddie May for the 1997–98 season, Myall had to wait until 1 November 1997 to make his debut, with a starting appearance in a 0–0 draw at AFC Bournemouth. Following May's sacking and the appointment of Micky Adams, Myall failed to make an appearance and departed the club in January 1998, having negotiated a settlement on his contract.

Hastings United 
Myall signed for Southern League Premier Division club Hastings Town prior to the start of the 1998–99 season, having previously had a spell on loan at the club during the 1996–97 season. The club resigned from the Southern League in 1999 after a fifth-place finish, but was reinstated to the Southern League First Division East for the 1999–00 season. Myall won the first silverware of his career during the 2001–02 season, when he helped Hastings to the Southern League First Division East title. Myall suffered an injury hit 2002–03 season and his woes were compounded by the club (now renamed Hastings United) being relegated straight back to the Southern League First Division East. He made 13 appearances and scored three goals during the 2002–03 season. Myall left Hastings in February 2004, after making 18 appearances and scoring four goals during the 2003–04 season. Myall made over 250 appearances during his time with the Arrows.

Eastbourne Borough 
Myall signed for Southern League Premier Division club Eastbourne Borough in February 2004 and made eight appearances in what remained of the 2003–04 season. Despite an 11th-place finish, Eastbourne were elevated to the new Conference South for the 2004–05 season, though Myall would depart the club in February 2005. He made only 9 appearances during the 2004–05 season.

Folkestone Invicta 
Myall transferred to Isthmian League Premier Division club Folkestone Invicta on 12 February 2005. He made 9 appearances and scored one goal during what remained of the 2004–05 season. Myall was a virtual ever-present during the 2005–06 season and made 41 appearances, scoring three goals. He made six appearances during the early part of the 2006–07 season, before leaving the club in September. Myall made 56 appearances and scored four goals during his time with the Seasiders.

Horsham 
Myall signed for Isthmian League Premier Division club Horsham in September 2006 and made 31 appearances and scored one goal during the 2006–07 season. Myall left Horsham at the end of the 2007–08 season, after making 33 appearances over the course of the campaign. He made 64 appearances and scored one goal during his time with the Hornets.

Eastbourne United Association 
Myall signed for Sussex County League Second Division club Eastbourne United Association in December 2012.

Late career 
Myall joined Kuala Lumpur Expat & Veterans League club KL International while resident in Malaysia. After moving to Hong Kong, he played for veterans' club Discovery Bay, finishing as champions of the Legal League in the 2014–15 season.

Coaching and managerial career 
In the late 1990s and early 2000s, Myall spent time in the US, coaching children in Atlanta and Chicago. As of April 2022, he was manager of Eastbourne Town Vets.

Personal life 
During a Q&A for a Brentford matchday programme in September 1997, Myall revealed he supported Liverpool as a boy. Myall worked office jobs in the early 2000s, but was inspired to become a PE teacher and enrolled on a course at Brighton University in 2002, graduating with a PE degree in 2005. He worked as a Head of department at a state school in Lambeth and later emigrated to Kuala Lumpur. Myall moved from Kuala Lumpur to take up the position of Head of Secondary Physical Education at the Discovery Bay International School in Hong Kong. He moved back to Britain in 2015 to become a Head of Section and teacher of sport at Gildredge House Free School in his hometown, Eastbourne.

Honours 
 Hastings United
Southern League First Division East: 2001–02
Discovery Bay
 Legal League: 2014–15

Career statistics

References

Bibliography

External links

1974 births
Living people
Sportspeople from Eastbourne
English footballers
Association football defenders
Eastbourne United A.F.C. players
Horsham F.C. players
Folkestone Invicta F.C. players
Eastbourne Borough F.C. players
Hastings United F.C. players
Brentford F.C. players
Brighton & Hove Albion F.C. players
Southern Football League players
Isthmian League players
British expatriates in Malaysia
Schoolteachers from Sussex
English expatriate sportspeople in Hong Kong
Expatriate footballers in Hong Kong
English expatriate footballers